The 1904 Bethany Terrible Swedes football team represented Bethany College during the 1904 college football season.  The team notably beat Oklahoma 36–9.

References

Bethany
Bethany Swedes football seasons
College football undefeated seasons
Bethany Terrible Swedes football